Liverpool Football Club is an English association football club based in Liverpool, Merseyside. The club was formed in 1892 following a disagreement between the board of Everton and club president John Houlding, who owned the club's ground, Anfield. The disagreement between the two parties over rent resulted in Everton moving to Goodison Park from Anfield, which left Houlding with an empty stadium. Thus, he founded Liverpool F.C. to play in the empty stadium. Liverpool won the First Division title for the first time in 1901; since then, the club has won a further eighteen league titles, along with eight FA Cups, nine Football League Cups, and sixteen FA Community Shields. They have also been crowned champions of European football on six occasions, winning the European Cup/UEFA Champions League in 1977, 1978, 1981, 1984, 2005, and 2019, and UEFA Cup winners on three occasions. The club was one of 22 members of the Premier League when it was formed in 1992.

As of the end of the 2021–22 season, the team have spent 107 seasons in the top tier of the English football league system and eleven in the second. The table details the team's achievements and the top goalscorer in senior first-team competitions from their first in the Lancashire League and FA Cup during the 1892–93 season to the end of the most recently completed season. Details of the abandoned 1939–40 season and unofficial Second World War leagues are not included.

History 
Liverpool F.C. were formed in 1892, following a rent dispute between the leaseholder of Anfield, John Houlding, and Everton Football Club, which left Houlding with a ground but no club playing in it. In their first season Liverpool won the Lancashire League, and were elected to the Football League Second Division for the 1893–94 season, going on to win the title without losing a match. Their first season in the First Division ended in relegation, before they were promoted back the following season. Liverpool won the First Division for the first time in the 1900–01 season, and reached their first |FA Cup Final in 1914, losing 1–0 to Burnley. They won their first back-to-back titles in the 1921–22 and 1922–23 seasons; this was their last success until the 1946–47 season, when they regained the league title. Relegated in the 1953–54 season, they did not regain their place in the First Division until the 1962–63 season under the management of Bill Shankly.

Liverpool first participated in European competition during the 1964–65 season, a season which represented Liverpool's first FA Cup triumph. They won their first European trophy, the UEFA Cup, during the 1972–73 season. The club won the European Cup during the 1976–77 season and retained the trophy the following year. Liverpool won a unique treble of the League, the European Cup and League Cup during the 1983–84 season. They won their first double of league championship and FA Cup in 1986, and during the 2000–01 season they won another treble, this one consisting of the FA Cup, League Cup and UEFA Cup. Liverpool won their first Premier League trophy in the 2019–20 season under Jürgen Klopp.

Key 

PL = Premier League
Division 1 = Football League First Division
Division 2 = Football League Second Division
Lancs = Lancashire League
Pld = Matches played
W = Matches won
D = Matches drawn
L = Matches lost
GF = Goals for
GA = Goals against
Pts = Points
Pos = Final position

QR3 = Third qualifying round
R32 = Round of 32
R16 = Round of 16
R1 = Round 1
R2 = Round 2
R3 = Round 3
R4 = Round 4
R5 = Round 5
R6 = Round 6
Grp = Group stage
QF = Quarter-finals
SF = Semi-finals

Seasons 
Correct as of the end of the 2021–22 season.

Notes

References

External links 

Seasons
 
Liverpool